= Out of Madness =

2024 psychological thriller dark comedy novel by Rithwik Aryan

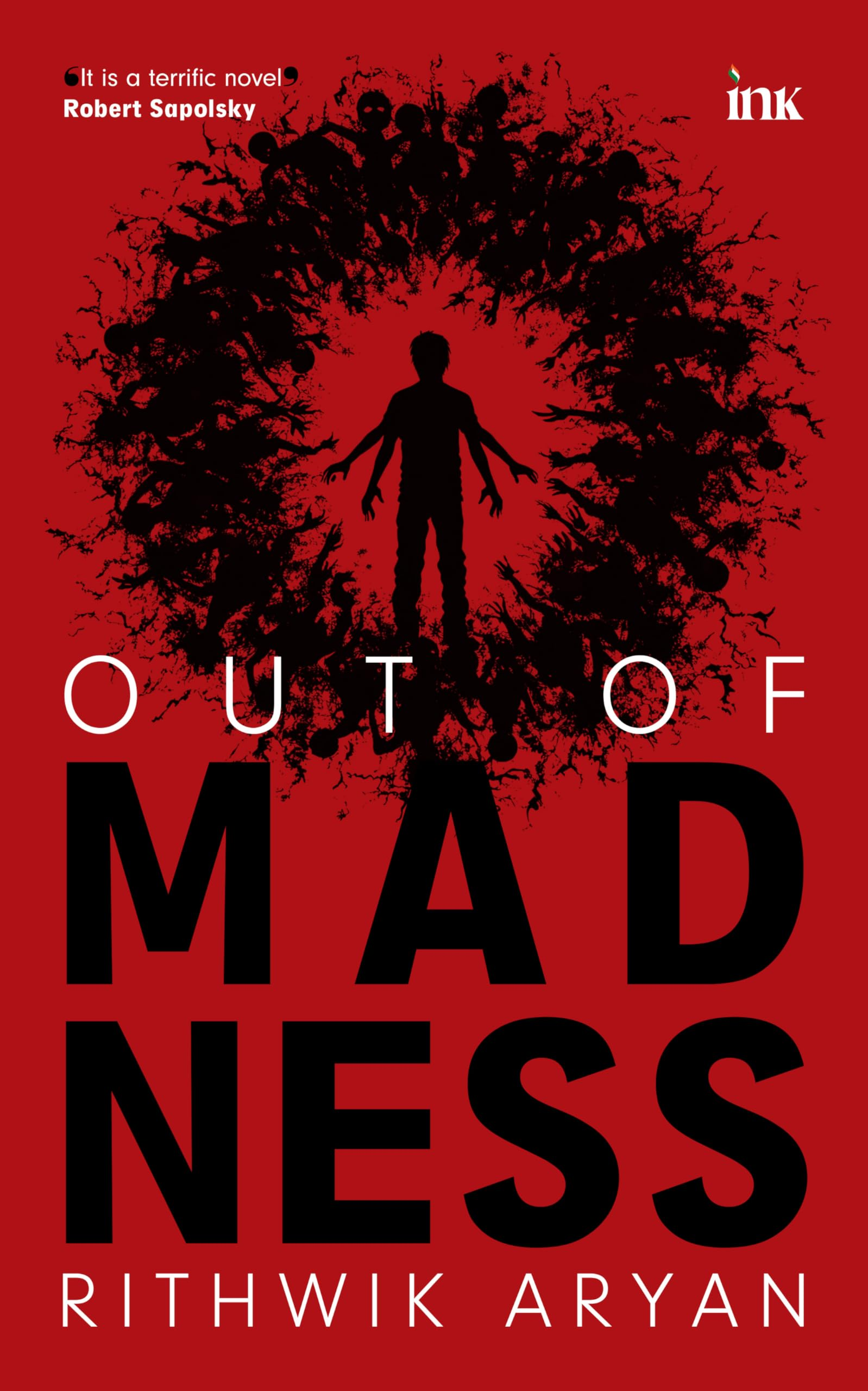
- First edition cover
- Author: Rithwik Aryan
- Language: English
- Genre: Psychological thriller, Dark comedy
- Publisher: BluOne Ink
- Publication date: November 2024
- Publication place: India
- Media type: Print (paperback), eBook
- Pages: 449
- Followed by: Point Nemo

Out of Madness is a 2024 psychological thriller/ dark comedy novel by Indian author Rithwik Aryan, published by BluOne Ink. Known for its realistic and satirical portrayal of mental health, identity and scandal.

Aryan dropped out of Harvard Extension School and spent 18 months in two of India's most dangerous mental asylums- The Central Institute of Psychiatry in Ranchi and the Agra Mental Asylum to conduct research for Out of Madness. This allowed him to bring an authentic portrayal of mental health issues and the asylum environment to the novel.

Times Now has ranked Rithwik at Number 6 along with George Orwell and Hunter S. Thompson among 12 Authors who took extreme measures to write their novels.

== Plot ==
The novel centers around Mason Moron, a 24 year old Assistant Professor of Psychology at Nalanda University, who, after discovering his wife's infidelity stages his own death and disappears. Seeking refuge from his former life, he becomes entangled with Bahubali, a former politician turned madman artist determined to create an erotic masterpiece. As Mason's life spirals further into chaos, he is eventually institutionalized in a mental asylum, where he meets the famous actress Miss Staci, who is struggling with morphine addiction.

== Publication and reception ==
Aryan finished the novel in May 2025, six years after starting it. Out of Madness was released in November 2024. The novel was well received by critics, who praised it for its blend of dark comedy and psychological thriller elements.

Mayank Parichha of The New Indian Express wrote "Aryan’s lack of inhibition in describing carnal desires, sexual fantasies, and intrusive thoughts is absolutely phenomenal. One can even read this novel for the author’s daring and badass writing style" while Avantika Sharma of India Today mentioned "At times, I found myself taken back by Aryan's effortless command over certain heavy-hitting terms that would make many writers pause, perhaps even reconsider twice, or maybe several times".
